UF3 or UF-3 may refer to:

 Uranium trifluoride, a low-valency uranium fluoride
 French submarine Astrée (Q200), a French submarine which was captured by Nazi Germany and renamed "UF-3"